Victoria Group is a Serbian holding company with the headquarters in Belgrade, Serbia. It is a majority owner by Netherlands-based ADM Europe. Victoria Group has a total of 15 companies within its holding, which performs a variety of services, mainly agribusiness and wholesale.

History
Victoria Group was founded on 8 November 2001 in Belgrade, FR Yugoslavia, by Serbian businessmen Stanko Popović, Milija Babović and Zoran Mitrović.

Since 2015, Victoria Group began accumulating debt, finishing 2015 and 2016 calendar year, with total net loss in range of 50 million euros. In November 2017, company's management confirmed media reports that it is seeking strategic partnership with investors due to capital loss over last years and over-indebtedness of the company.

In July 2018, it was announced that Serbian holding company MK Group has bought the majority of shares of indebted Victoria Group.

On November 22, 2021, MK Group, together with Milija Babović and Apsara limited, sold 100% of shares to ADM Europe for undisclosed amount.

Market and financial data
Victoria Group was ranked as the third net exporter company of Serbia and first in food-processing sector for the calendar year of 2015, mainly though its subsidiary companies Sojaprotein and Victoriaoil.

Subsidiaries
This is a list of subsidiary companies of Victoria Group:
 Victoria Logistic d.o.o.
 Victoriaoil a.d.
 Sojaprotein a.d.
 SP Laboratorija a.d.
 Fertil d.o.o.
 Luka Bačka Palanka d.o.o.
 Veterinarski zavod a.d. Subotica
 Victoria Phosphate d.o.o.
 Vobex Intersoja
 Victoria Food d.o.o.
 Activex d.o.o.
 Živinarstvo promet d.o.o.
 Victoria Starch d.o.o.
 Ribotex d.o.o.
 Agrofamily d.o.o.

See also
 Agriculture in Serbia

References

External links
 

2018 mergers and acquisitions
Agriculture companies of Serbia
Companies based in Belgrade
Conglomerate companies of Serbia
Holding companies established in 2001
Holding companies of Serbia
Serbian companies established in 2001